Tremont Township is a township in Schuylkill County, Pennsylvania, United States. The population was 280 at the 2020 census.

Geography
According to the United States Census Bureau, the township has a total area of 23.3 square miles (60.4 km), all  land.

Demographics

At the 2000 census there were 250 people, 95 households, and 72 families living in the township.  The population density was 10.7 people per square mile (4.1/km).  There were 100 housing units at an average density of 4.3/sq mi (1.7/km).  The racial makeup of the township was 99.60% White, and 0.40% from two or more races.
Of the 95 households 31.6% had children under the age of 18 living with them, 61.1% were married couples living together, 8.4% had a female householder with no husband present, and 24.2% were non-families. 16.8% of households were one person and 10.5% were one person aged 65 or older.  The average household size was 2.60 and the average family size was 2.86.

The age distribution was 22.8% under the age of 18, 8.8% from 18 to 24, 26.4% from 25 to 44, 30.4% from 45 to 64, and 11.6% 65 or older.  The median age was 38 years. For every 100 females, there were 108.3 males.  For every 100 females age 18 and over, there were 96.9 males.

The median household income was $34,000 and the median family income  was $44,375. Males had a median income of $30,833 versus $24,375 for females. The per capita income for the township was $16,573.  About 2.8% of families and 9.4% of the population were below the poverty line, including 2.2% of those under the age of 18 and 8.0% of those 65 or over.

References

Townships in Schuylkill County, Pennsylvania
Townships in Pennsylvania